Telestes croaticus, the Croatian Pijor, is a species of cyprinid fish.

It is found only in Croatia.

Its natural habitats are rivers and inland karsts.
It is threatened by habitat loss.

References

Further reading
 

Telestes
Endemic fauna of Croatia
Cyprinid fish of Europe
Fish described in 1866
Taxonomy articles created by Polbot